Dominus or domini may refer to:

 Dominus (title), a title of sovereignty, clergy and other uses

Art, entertainment, and media 
 Dominus (band), a Danish death metal band 
 Dominus (DC Comics), an alien character in DC Comics
 Dominus (Marvel Comics), an alien computer in Marvel Comics
 Dominus (video game), a 1994 DOS computer game
 "Dominus" (Voltron: The Third Dimension), a 1998 episode

People
 Amy Domini, American investment adviser and author
 Sergio Domini (born 1961), Italian professional football player
 Tommaso Domini (born 1989), Italian football midfielder
 Vincenzo de Domini (1816–1903), Venetian patriot and officer in the Austrian Navy
 Domini Blythe (1947–2010), British-born Canadian actress
 Domini Crosfield (1884–1963), British politician and tennis player

Other uses
 Tajuria dominus, species of butterfly in the genus Tajuria
 Dominus Estate, a Napa Valley winery
 Dominus (genus), genus of sea snails

See also
 Anno Domini (disambiguation)
 AD (disambiguation)
 Domino (disambiguation)